Ulyanovsk State Agricultural University is a major higher education and research institution in Ulyanovsk. It was established in 1943.

References

External links
Official site

Universities in Volga Region
Ulyanovsk
Buildings and structures in Ulyanovsk Oblast
Educational institutions established in 1943
Agricultural universities and colleges in Russia
1943 establishments in Russia
Cultural heritage monuments in Ulyanovsk Oblast
Objects of cultural heritage of Russia of federal significance